Stanley Harvey Lebor (24 September 1934 – 22 November 2014) was an English actor. He was best known for his roles as Howard Hughes in the 1980s BBC TV comedy series Ever Decreasing Circles, the Mongon Doctor in Flash Gordon (1980), and as RSM Lord in A Bridge Too Far (1977). Before this he was better known for villainous roles in series such as Jason King and The Tomorrow People.

Life
Lebor was born in East Ham, London. He studied acting at RADA in London. In 1961 he joined the Radio Drama Company by winning the Carlton Hobbs Bursary.

He appeared in Minder in the Series 1 episode The Bengal Tiger, The Naked Civil Servant, Ever Decreasing Circles, Tarka the Otter, Gandhi, Grange Hill, 'Allo 'Allo!, Superman IV: The Quest for Peace and Last of the Summer Wine. In 1986 he acted with Lynda Baron in a party political broadcast for the SDP–Liberal Alliance.

Filmography
The Deadly Affair (1966) – Lancaster (in "Edward II") (uncredited)
Oh! What a Lovely War (1969) – Soldier in Gassed Trench (uncredited)
Arthur? Arthur! (1969) – Analyst
Crossplot (1969) – First policeman
Up the Front (1972) – Blitzen
Nothing But the Night (1973) – Policeman
Soft Beds, Hard Battles (1974) – 1st Gestapo Agent
I Don't Want to Be Born (1975) – Police Sergeant
Hennessy (1975) – Hawk
The Naked Civil Servant (1975) – Mr. Pole
A Bridge Too Far (1977) – Regimental Sergeant Major
The Medusa Touch (1978) – Police Doctor
Tarka the Otter (1979) – Farm Labourer
Flash Gordon (1980) – Mongon Doctor
Gandhi (1982) – Police Officer
Ha-Kala (1985) – Ziggy
Personal Services (1987) – Jones
Superman IV: The Quest for Peace (1987) – General Romoff
La Passione (1996) – Harry Lambert

TV credits
Elizabeth R - Episode 1: "The Lion's Cub" - Sir Robert Tyrwhitt (1971)
 Man of Straw – Herr Cohn (1972)
The Protectors – Medina (1972)
The Tomorrow People – Gaius (1974)
Star Maidens – Carlo (1976)
1990 – Digger Radford (1978)
Holocaust – Zalman (1978)
 Minder – Wilson (1979)
Shoestring – Restaurant Manager (1980)
Hammer House of Horror – Charles (episode: "Visitor From The Grave", 1980)
Grange Hill – Mr. Durrant (1983)
Ever Decreasing Circles – Howard Hughes (1984-1989)
Last of the Summer Wine – Bramwell (episode: "The Phantom No 14 Bus", 1999)

References

External links
 

1934 births
2014 deaths
English male stage actors
English male film actors
English male television actors
People from East Ham